Borken (Westphalian: Buorken) is a town and the capital of the district of the same name, in North Rhine-Westphalia, Germany.

Geography
Borken is situated 10 km east of the Dutch border. Borken station is the northern terminus on the remaining section of the Gelsenkirchen-Bismarck–Winterswijk railway.

Neighbouring places
 Raesfeld
 Heiden
 Südlohn
 Rhede
 Velen

Division of the town
Borken consists of 12 districts:

The 10 largest groups of foreign residents by 31 December 2018:

History

The name comes from the German word "Burg" or "Burk" and gradually changed to "Burke", then "Burken" and finally to "Borken". Around the year 800 the village was being used by Charles The Great (Charlemagne) as a stopover place on his travels. In 1226 City rights were granted by Bishop Dietrich II of Isenberg-Limburg. Fortification of the city with walls and towers was first noted in 1391.

In the last years of the Holy Roman Empire (1803–06) it was the capital of the short-lived principality of Salm. From 1810 to 1814 it was part of the French Empire. In 1815 Borken came under the jurisdiction of the Prussian Province of Westphalia. At the same time it became the seat of government for the newly formed district or county of Borken (Kreis Borken). Between 1880 and 1905 the area experienced the building of railroad connections: (1880 Wanne-Borken-Winterswijk line, 1901 Empel-Bocholt-Borken and Borken-Burgsteinfurt, 1905 Borken-Coesfeld-Münster).

Near the end of World War II the historic center of the city was heavily destroyed. After the war, community rearrangements followed in 1969, including annexation of Gemen and other towns in the vicinity. Between 1975 and 1978 came the cleaning up and rebuilding of the southern part of the old city. There, buildings which had outlasted the destruction of the Second World War were finally demolished. In 2001 Borken celebrated its 775th anniversary.

Twin towns – sister cities

Borken is twinned with:

 Albertslund, Denmark
 Bolków, Poland
 Grabow, Germany
 Mölndal, Sweden
 Říčany, Czech Republic
 Whitstable, England, United Kingdom

Notable people

Born in Borken

Marvin Grumann (born 1993), footballer
Cornelia "Coco" Maaßen (born 1999), handballer
Otto Leopold of Limburg Stirum (1684–1754), Lord of Gemen and Raesfeld, General of the Imperial Army
Jacques Palminger (born 1964), musician
Jochen Schmidt (1936–2010), journalist and dance critic
Ilse von Stach (1879–1941), writer

Connected with Borken
Marcus Ehning (born 1974), jumping rider, lives in Borken-Weseke
Herbert Lütkebohmert (1948–1993), footballer, lived in Borken and is buried here
Léonide Massine (1896–1979), dancer and choreographer, died in Borken

Gallery

References

External links
 Official site 
 Heraldry of Borken

Towns in North Rhine-Westphalia
Borken (district)
Members of the Hanseatic League